The Men's sprint event at the 2008 Summer Paralympics took place on September 10 at the Laoshan Velodrome. The event was competed by blind & visually impaired athletes.

Qualification times were set in a 200m flying start (6.5 laps). Races were 6 laps.

Qualification 
PR = Paralympic Record

As there were only 8 entrants, all qualified for the semi-finals. The qualification was necessary to set up the pairings (1st vs 8th, 2nd vs 7th, etc.), which in turn affected participation in the 5th-6th or 7th-8th race-offs.

Quarter-finals 
Match 1

Match 2

Match 3

Match 4

The winners of each heat qualified to Semifinals. Losers of 1st and 2nd heats raced off for 7th and 8th places, losers of heats 3 and 4 for 5th and 6th places.

Semi-finals 
Match 1

Match 2

 were relegated for moving outward with the intention of forcing the opponent to go up.

Finals 
Gold Medal Match

Bronze Medal Match

 were relegated in the second run for entering the sprinter's lane when the opponent was already there.

5-8 Place Matches

References

Men's sprint